Ettore Margadonna (30 November 1893 – 28 October 1975) was an Italian screenwriter. He was nominated for the Academy Award for Best Story for the film Bread, Love and Dreams (1953).

Selected filmography
 The Ferocious Saladin (1937)
 All of Life in One Night (1938)
 Star of the Sea (1938)
 Pietro Micca (1938)
 Mad Animals (1939)
 The Sons of the Marquis Lucera (1939)
 Backstage (1939)
 Diamonds (1939)
 The Happy Ghost (1941)
 Malombra (1942)
 Last Love (1947)
 The Opium Den (1947)
 The Black Captain (1951)
 Bread, Love and Dreams (1953)
 Il viale della speranza (1953)
 Tuppe tuppe, Marescià! (1958)

External links

References 

20th-century Italian screenwriters
Italian male screenwriters
1893 births
1975 deaths
20th-century Italian male writers